Phosphila is a genus of moths of the family Noctuidae.

Species
 Phosphila cinerea (Sepp, [1829])
 Phosphila dogmatica (Dyar, 1916)
 Phosphila fernae (Benjamin, 1933)
 Phosphila lacruma (Schaus, 1894)
 Phosphila miselioides (Guenée, 1852)
 Phosphila turbulenta Hübner, 1818
 Phosphila ursipes Hübner, 1823
 Phosphila xylophila (Walker, 1858)

References
Natural History Museum Lepidoptera genus database
Phosphila at funet

Hadeninae